Cinecom Pictures was an independent film company founded in 1982 by Ira Deutchman (a former member of United Artists Classics), Amir Malin and John Ives.  Its first release was Robert Altman's Come Back to the Five and Dime, Jimmy Dean, Jimmy Dean.

The company also distributed The Brother from Another Planet and Salaam Bombay!. Its highest-grossing release was 1985's A Room with a View. It closed down in 1991 after it filed for bankruptcy and sold to PolyGram Filmed Entertainment.

Selected films released
1982: Come Back to the Five and Dime, Jimmy Dean Jimmy Dean (Robert Altman)
1982: Starstruck (Gillian Armstrong)
1983: Angelo My Love (Robert Duval)
1983: City News (David Fishelson)
1983: El Norte (Gregory Nava)
1983: L'Argent (Robert Bresson)
1984: 1918 (Ken Harrison)
1984: Boy Meets Girl (Leos Carax)
1984: The Brother From Another Planet (John Sayles)
1984: Last Night at the Alamo (Eagle Pennell)
1984: Metropolis (Fritz Lang)
1984: Secret Honor (Robert Altman)
1984: Stop Making Sense (Jonathan Demme)
1984: The Times of Harvey Milk (Robert Epstein)
1984: Burroughs (Howard Brookner)
1984 The Revolt of Job (Imre Gyongyossy and Barna Kabay)
1985: The Coca-Cola Kid (Dusan Makavejev)
1985: Latino (Haskell Wexler)
1985: Pumping Iron 2 (George Butler)
1985 Let Ye Inherit (Imre Gyongyossy, Barna Kabay, atalin Petenyi)
1985 Tom Goes to the Bar (Dean Prisot)
1986: Home of the Brave (Laurie Anderson)
1986: Menage (Bertrand Blier)
1986: Native Son (Jerrold Freeman)
1986: Parting Glances (Bill Sherwood)
1986: A Room With A View (James Ivory)
1987: Julia and Julia (Peter Del Monte)
1987: The Lighthorsemen (Simon Wincer) 
1987: A Man in Love (Diane Kurys)
1987: Matewan (John Sayles)
1987: Maurice (James Ivory)
1987: Sammy and Rosie Get Laid (Stephen Frears)
1987: Swimming to Cambodia (Jonathan Demme)
1988: The Deceivers (Nicholas Meyer)
1988: Miles from Home (Gary Sinise)
1988: Salaam Bombay (Mira Nair)
1989: Last Exit to Brooklyn (Uli Edel)
1989: Queen of Hearts (Jon Amiel)
1989: Scenes from the Class Struggle in Beverly Hills (Paul Bartel)
1990: The Handmaid's Tale (Volker Schlondorff)
1990: Rosencrantz & Guildenstern Are Dead (Tom Stoppard)
1990: Tune in Tomorrow (Jon Amiel)
1991: Mississippi Masala'' (Mira Nair)

References

Film distributors
Mass media companies established in 1982
Film production companies of the United States
Companies based in New York City